Feathers is the fourth album by the Washington, D.C. based psychedelic rock trio Dead Meadow, released in 2005 by Matador Records on CD and LP. The band is joined on the album by additional guitar player Cory Shane. 

Pitchfork praised the record and the band's ability to "venture further outside their 60s influences to create a spacious, hypnotic album that distinguishes them from their stoner- and psych-rock contemporaries."

In 2019 the album was reissued on CD and LP by Tekeli-li Records, and accompanied by a bonus CD featuring alternate takes, unreleased tracks and instrumental demos.

Track listing
"Let's Jump In" - 4:19
"Such Hawks Such Hounds" - 3:19
"Get Up on Down" - 5:27
"Heaven" - 6:05
"At Her Open Door" - 5:31
"Eyeless Gaze All Eye/Don't Tell the Riverman" - 7:04
"Stacy's Song" - 4:05
"Let It All Pass" - 5:20
"Through the Gates of the Sleepy Silver Door" - 2:01

Bonus Track (CD and Digital):
 "Sleepy Silver Door (Extended)" - 13:44

Notes:
Track 10 (unlisted CD-only bonus track, often labeled "Untitled") is a re-recorded and extended version of "Sleepy Silver Door" from Dead Meadow's self-titled first album.

Personnel
Jason Simon – Guitar, Vocals
Cory Shane – Guitar, Vocals 
Steve Kille – Bass, Sitar  
Stephen McCarty  – Drums

References

2005 albums
Dead Meadow albums
Matador Records albums